Robomodo was an American independent video game developer based in Chicago, Illinois. Robomodo was formed in early 2008 by former employees of Midway Games and EA Chicago. They are best known for being the developer of several post-Neversoft games in the Tony Hawk franchise from Tony Hawk: Ride (2009) to Tony Hawk's Pro Skater 5 (2015), most of which were met with varying degrees of negative reception from critics and fans alike. Nearly a year after Tony Hawk's Pro Skater 5 was released, Robomodo went out of business.

Game history
On November 28, 2011, the company launched a project on Kickstarter to produce a game called Bodoink, a pinball-inspired game using the Kinect for Xbox Live Arcade. The game was being developed by its subsidiary Robomite, which focused on family-friendly games, and had a funding goal of $35,000.

Games
Tony Hawk: Ride (2009)
Tony Hawk: Shred (2010)
In Time (2011)
Big League Sports: Kinect (2011)
Tony Hawk's Pro Skater HD (2012)
Skateboard Slam (2013)
Hunger Games: Catching Fire Panem Run (2013) 
Globber's Escape (2014)
Monster Flash (2014) 
Tony Hawk's Pro Skater 5 (2015; with Disruptive Games)

References

External links 
Official website via Internet Archive

2008 establishments in Illinois
2016 disestablishments in Illinois
Defunct companies based in Chicago
Defunct video game companies of the United States
Video game companies established in 2008
Video game companies disestablished in 2016
Video game development companies